The whistling fruit dove (Ptilinopus layardi), also known as the velvet dove or yellow-headed dove, is a small fruit dove from Fiji. The species is endemic to the islands of Kadavu and Ono in the Kadavu Group in the south of Fiji.

Taxonomy
The whistling fruit dove is the most primitive of the "golden doves", a small subgroup of the genus Ptilinopus which includes two other small Fijian fruit doves, the golden fruit dove and the orange fruit dove. The group was once split into its own genus, Chrysoenas.

Description
The whistling fruit dove is a small dove (20 cm) that is sexually dimorphic in its velvety plumage. The plumage of the male is dark green with a yellow head and undertail coverts, the female lacks the yellow plumage. They are difficult to see in the forest canopy, but can be found due to their distinctive call, a clear rising whistle followed by a falling 'tinkle'

Behaviour

Feeding
The species feeds on fruits in the forest canopy.

Breeding
The breeding of this species has not been studied much. A nest described in 1982 was a 'loose thin platform' constructed with twig-like vines 3 m above the ground (Beckon 1982). A single nestling was described. Only the female took care of the young. If this pattern of parental care is widespread in the golden dove group to which the whistling dove belongs, it represents an unusual adaption within the pigeon family. This difference in the levels of parental care was suggested as an explanation of the sexual dimorphism in the golden doves.

Conservation
The whistling fruit dove is considered near threatened by the IUCN. The species is currently common in the forests of Kadavu and Ono, with an estimated population of 10,000 birds (BirdLife International 2006). However it has a restricted range and it is declining due to habitat loss.

References

 Beckon, W (1982) "A breeding record of the Whistling Dove of Kadavu, Fiji" Notornis 29(1): 1-7 
 BirdLife International (2006) Species factsheet: Ptilinopus layardi. Downloaded from http://www.birdlife.org on 17/9/2006
 Pratt, H., Bruner, P & Berrett, D. (1987) The Birds of Hawaii and the Tropical Pacific Princeton University Press:Princeton 

Endemic birds of Fiji
Columbidae
Ptilinopus
Birds described in 1878
Taxobox binomials not recognized by IUCN